These hits topped the Ultratop 50 in 2007.

See also
Ultratop 40 number-one hits of 2007
2007 in music

References

Ultratop 50
Belgium Ultratop 50
2007